VAAP may refer to:
 Volunteer Army Ammunition Plant, now the site of the Enterprise South Industrial Park in Tennessee
 Vsesoiuznoe agentstvo po avtorskim pravam, an agency which oversaw the copyright law of Russia